Building a Character is the second of stage actor/director Constantin Stanislavski's three books on his method for learning the art of acting. It was first published in Russian in 1948; Elizabeth Reynolds Hapgood's seminal English translation was published by Theatre Art Books of New York the following year.

In Stanislavski's most widely read work, An Actor Prepares, he describes a process by which an actor imagines the character he will become. 
In Building a Character, he explains that the outward expressions of character must flow from that character's inner life: his memories, beliefs, preoccupations, and so on. He then elaborates ways in which the actor's manner of speech, dress, and movement (gestures, facial expressions, etc.) evidence the character's inner experience.

Creating a Role, the final book in the trilogy, followed Building a Character in 1957.

Contents
 Toward a Physical Characterization
 Dressing a Character
 Characters and Types
 Making the Body Expressive
 Plasticity of Motion
 Restraint and Control
 Diction and Singing
 Intonations and Pauses
 Accentuation: The Expressive Word
 Perspective in Character Building
 Tempo-Rhythm in Movement
 Speech Tempo-Rhythm
 Stage Charm
 Toward an Ethics for the Theatre
 Patterns of Accomplishment
 Some Conclusions on Acting

History 
Building a Character is the third volume in a set of three volumes that Stanislavski wrote which crafted a method for actors to develop techniques, acting, and characters for the acting craft. The first volume, My Life in the Art outlines Stanislavski's experience acting in the Moscow Art Theater. The second volume, An Actor Prepares, explores how actors prepare and the internalized processes that actors undergo when preparing for the stage.

Following volume two is Building a Character. This volume examines the externalized body and mechanisms external to the body. Building a character in this work includes the inflection, diction, and tone of the voice. It also includes the gait and movement of the body, as well as the body's interaction with props and other bodies. This volume also extends to the usage and wearing of costumes, including how the actor wears them and uses them to enrich the character portrayed on stage.

Stanislavki's theory transformed ways of acting so much that his method, which is similar to control theory, is now just referred to as "method" or "the method."

Reception 
Critics tend agree that Stanislavski's volumes are some of the most comprehensive and helpful books for actors trying to build their craft and stage characters. The series, especially Building a Character, focuses more on craft rather than literature and drama. Prior to the publication of Building a Character, there was a serious gap in manuals for actors in building a character for the stage through acting mechanics.

However, while the book fills gaps in acting craft, critics argue that development of a character on stage and the evolution of an individual's acting craft is difficult to obtain through reading. Rather, acting skills and character building occur through practice, experience, and adaptation to scenarios that occur on stage.

The book itself is also historically influenced by Russian culture and theater, as well as European theater, prior to World War I. There are still methods that are used by modern actors and on modern stages.

See also
 Stanislavski's system
 Method acting

References

External links
 

1948 non-fiction books
Non-fiction books about acting
Russian non-fiction books
Works about performing arts education